Dick Knight may refer to:

 Dick Knight (businessman), English businessman and former chairman of Brighton & Hove Albion F.C.
 Dick Knight (tennis) (born 1948), American tennis player
 Dick Knight (golfer) (1929–1991), American professional golfer

See also
Richard Knight (disambiguation)